Ramsay Crooks (2 January 1787 – 6 June 1859) was an American fur trader who immigrated to Canada from Greenock, Scotland. He was the father of American Civil War Colonel William Crooks who served in the 6th Minnesota Regiment. In 1803 Ramsay worked in a trading post on the Great Lakes. He helped W. Price Hunt to organize and lead an overland trip to Astoria in the Oregon Country for John Jacob Astor in 1809 through 1813, as a partner in the Pacific Fur Company. He became general manager of the American Fur Company in 1817 and was president of the company from 1834–1839. While traveling for the fur trade company he dealt with many Native American tribes. He married Abanokue, the daughter of an Ojibwa Chieftain. They had a daughter together, Hester Crooks. Abanokue died around 1825. Crooks then married Emilie Pratte and had nine children. He spent his final days in New York.

Early life and career
In 1803, when Crooks was 16 years old he arrived in Montreal, Quebec, with his family. He stayed in Montreal while his mother and the rest of the family went on to Newark. It has been reported that he was a clerk with Maitland, Garden and Auldjo, a Montreal mercantile firm that supplied dry goods and hardware to the Indians. Later it was said that he was in Niagara with fur traders and then was a clerk for fur trader Robert Dickson at Michilimackinac on Lake Huron. Today it is known as Mackinaw Island or Mackinac in Michigan. Ramsay was with George Gillespie (employed by Dickson) in 1805 and was in St Louis, Missouri, for him from 1805 to 1807 learning the fur trade.

By 1807, Crooks had enough funds, supplemented by the fur trading Choteau Family, to form a partnership with Robert McClellan with the aim of trading with the Indians on the Missouri River. McClellan was described as “a man of many perilous exploits and hairbreadth escapes, a sure shot, and one of the most romantic characters in the annals of the Western fur trade”. They formed an expedition of 40 men and went as far as South Dakota on the Missouri, but were forced back to Council Bluffs, Iowa, by about 600 Sioux. They erected a trading post at Council Bluffs. Crooks and McClellan believed the Sioux were spurred on by Manuel Lisa, a Spanish trader of the Missouri Fur Company, and McClellan swore if he ever met Lisa he would kill him. Later, with the Astor Expedition, he met Lisa on the Missouri, but, with difficulty, he was restrained from carrying out his threat. In 1809 Crooks and McClellan dissolved their partnership, and Crooks went to Mackinac to work for the Northwest Company (fur traders) where William Price Hunt, the organizer of the Astor expedition, signed him as a partner in the Astor group to take part in the expedition.

References

Ramsay Crooks Biography
History - Minnesota Infantry (Part 1)
Ramsay Crooks Obituary in Minnesota Daily Pioneer and Democrat June 23, 1859

External links
The American Fur Trade
Ramsay Crooks
Biography at the Dictionary of Canadian Biography Online

1787 births
1859 deaths
Canadian fur traders
Scottish emigrants to pre-Confederation Ontario
Persons of National Historic Significance (Canada)
Immigrants to Upper Canada
American Fur Company people
People from Greenock
American fur traders